There have been two baronetcies created for persons with the surname Buxton, one in the Baronetage of Great Britain and one in the Baronetage of the United Kingdom. One creation is extinct while the other is extant.

The Buxton Baronetcy, of Shadwell Lodge in the County of Norfolk, was created in the Baronetage of Great Britain on 25 November 1800 for Robert Buxton. The Norfolk Buxtons are thought to have taken their name from the Norfolk village of that name and to have descended from Robert Buxton MP (1533–1607), an attorney in the service of Thomas, Duke of Norfolk. The first Baronet was the grandson of John Buxton who designed and built Shadwell Lodge at Rushford, Norfolk. He was member of parliament for Thetford 1790–96 and for Great Bedwyn 1797–1806. His son, the second Baronet represented Great Bedwyn 1818–32 and served as High Sheriff of Norfolk in 1841. His son, the third Baronet, was member for South Norfolk 1871–85 and High Sheriff in 1870. The baronetcy became extinct on his death in 1888. His daughter sold the estates in 1898.

The Buxton Baronetcy, of Belfield in the County of Dorset, was created in the Baronetage of the United Kingdom on 30 July 1840 for the brewer, Liberal politician, anti-slavery campaigner, philanthropist, and social reformer Thomas Buxton. His eldest son Edward, the second Baronet, represented Essex South and Norfolk East in Parliament. His son Thomas, the third Baronet, was Governor of South Australia between 1895 and 1899.

Three other members of the family have been elevated to the peerage. Sydney Buxton, 1st Earl Buxton was the son of Charles Buxton, third son of the first Baronet. Noel Noel-Buxton, 1st Baron Noel-Buxton was the second son of the third Baronet. Aubrey Buxton, Baron Buxton of Alsa, was the son Leland William Wilberforce Buxton (1884–1967), youngest son of the third Baronet.

Buxton baronets, of Shadwell Lodge (1800)
Sir Robert John Buxton, 1st Baronet (1753–1839)
Sir John Jacob Buxton, 2nd Baronet (1788–1842)
Sir Robert Jacob Buxton, 3rd Baronet (1829–1888)

Buxton baronets, of Belfield (1840)
Sir Thomas Fowell Buxton, 1st Baronet (1786–1845)
Sir Edward North Buxton, 2nd Baronet (1812–1858)
Sir Thomas Fowell Buxton, 3rd Baronet,  (1837–1915)
Sir Thomas Fowell Victor Buxton, 4th Baronet (1865–1919)
Sir Thomas Buxton, 5th Baronet (1889–1945)
Sir Thomas Fowell Victor Buxton, 6th Baronet (1925–1996)
Sir Jocelyn Charles Roden Buxton, 7th Baronet (1924–2014)
Sir Crispin Charles Gerard Buxton, 8th Baronet (born 1958)

The heir presumptive is the present holder's second cousin, Jonathan Buxton (born 1950)

See also
Baron Noel-Buxton
Earl Buxton

Notes

References 

Baronetcies in the Baronetage of the United Kingdom
Extinct baronetcies in the Baronetage of Great Britain
Buxton family